Haozhuang (郝庄) may refer to the following locations in China:

 Haozhuang, Lincheng County, town in Hebei
 Haozhuang, Taiyuan, town in Yingze District, Taiyuan, Shanxi
 Haozhuang Township, Hebei, in Wuji County
 Haozhuang Township, Shanxi, in Jiang County

See also
 Hao (surname)